Subsea production systems are typical wells located on the seabed, shallow or deep water. Generally termed as Floating production system, where the petroleum is extracted at the seabed and the same can be tied back to an already existing production platform or an onshore facility. The oil platform well is drilled by a movable rig and the extracted oil or natural gas is transported by submarine pipeline under the sea and then to rise to a processing facility. 
It is classified into
 Subsea production control system
 Subsea structures and manifold system
 Subsea intervention system
 Subsea umbilical system
 Subsea processing system

References

See also
Christmas tree (oil well)
List of offshore wind farms
Marine engineering
Ocean engineering
Offshore geotechnical engineering
Oil well
Wellhead
Riserless Light Well Intervention
Passive heave compensation
Subsea (technology)

Petroleum geology
Oil wells
Marine geology